Eagle Air may refer to:
 Arnarflug, a former airline based in Iceland known internationally as Eagle Air
 Eagle Air (Guinea), an airline based in Guinea
 Eagle Air (Iceland), an airline based in Iceland
 Eagle Air (Sierra Leone), a former airline based in Sierra Leone
 Eagle Air (Tanzania), a former airline based in Tanzania
 Eagle Air (Uganda), an airline based in Uganda
 Eagle Airways (UK), the 1950s airline later titled British Eagle
 Eagle Airways, a former airline based in New Zealand

See also
 PRiMA Aero Trasporti Italiani, an Italian airline formerly known as Eagles Airlines